The Kambui Hills Forest Reserve occupies an area of 14,335 hectares in the Eastern Province of Sierra Leone.  It is located 10 kilometres from the town of Kenema with terrain consisting of steep slopes that reach an altitude of between 100 and 645 metres. The area mainly contains forest habitat but there is also some savanna and wetland. Over 200 separate species of birds have been recorded in the reserve including vulnerable species the white-necked picathartes and green-tailed bristlebill and near threatened species the yellow-casqued hornbill, rufous-winged illadopsis and copper-tailed glossy-starling.

References

See also
 Protected areas of Sierra Leone

  	 
Eastern Province, Sierra Leone
Forest reserves of Sierra Leone